The Maharashtra Navnirman Sena (translation: Maharashtra Reformation Army;  MNS) is a Regionalist far-right Indian political party based in the state of Maharashtra and operates on the ideology of "Hindutva" and "Marathi" Manus. It was founded on 9 March 2006 in Mumbai by Raj Thackeray after he left the Shiv Sena party due to differences with his cousin Uddhav Thackeray, who was the 19th Chief Minister Of Maharashtra and to his sidelining by the Shiv Sena in major decisions like distribution of election tickets.

MNS won 13 assembly seats (out of 288) in the 2009 assembly elections, which was the first Maharashtra Legislative Assembly election that the party contested. In the most recent elections of Maharashtra Legislative Assembly 2019, MNS won only 1 seat.
In January 2020, MNS unveiled a new flag, however the symbol on the flag was not used for elections.

Foundation
The party was founded by Raj Thackeray, nephew of late Shiv Sena leader Bal Thackeray and grandson of Prabodhankar Thackeray. Raj Thackeray resigned from his uncle's party in January 2006 and announced his intention to start a new political party. The reason given by him for breaking away from the Shiv Sena was that the latter was "run by petty clerks" because of which it had "fallen from its former glory".  Also, Thackeray declared his motive of building a political awareness for the development related issues of the state and giving them a center stage in national politics.

At the time of the party's foundation, Raj Thackeray stated that he does not want to have hostilities with his uncle who "was, is and always will be (his) mentor".

Although the MNS is a break-away group from the Shiv Sena, the party is still based on Marathi and Bhumiputra ideologies. When unveiling the party in an assembly at Shivaji Park he said, that everyone is anxious to see what will happen to Hindutva. When unveiling, he also said,
"I shall elaborate on the party's stance on issues like Sons of Soil and Marathi, its agenda for development of Maharashtra and the significance of the party flag colours at the March 19 public meeting."  Raj Thackeray considers himself an Indian nationalist. The party also recognises secularism as one of its core tenets.

Maharashtra Development Blueprint

In September 2014, MNS unveiled its first look of "Maharashtra's Development Blueprint" with the slogan 'Yes, it's possible’. The blueprint discusses party's stance and key ideas on infrastructure, governance, quality of life, growth opportunities and Marathi pride.

Controversies

2008 violence against North Indians in Maharashtra

 
In February 2008, some MNS activists clashed with Samajwadi Party (SP) party workers in Mumbai when Samajwadi Party supporters attended a rally at Shivaji Park, Dadar, Mumbai, a stronghold of MNS, where Samajwadi Party leader Abu Asim Azmi made a fiery speech. After the clashes, 73 MNS activists and 19 SP workers were arrested by Mumbai Police for violence.

On 6 February 2008, reportedly, about 200 MNS members quit the party and joined Shiv Sena due to the anti-north Indian stance of Raj Thackeray.

A petition was filed in the Patna civil court on 8 February against Thackeray for his alleged remarks over Chhath, the most popular festival of Bihar and Eastern Uttar Pradesh (Purvanchal). Mr. Thackeray maintains he is not against Chhath Puja, but against the "show of arrogance" and "Politicization of Chatth Puja" displayed by some people from Bihar and Eastern Uttar Pradesh on this occasion.

On 10 February 2008, MNS workers attacked vendors and shopkeepers from North India in various parts of Maharashtra, and destroyed government property to vent their anger against the reported move to arrest Raj Thackeray. Nashik police detained 26 MNS workers for violence.

In February 2008, Raj Thackarey's speech on the issue of migration into Mumbai from other parts of India created a well-publicised controversy. MNS supporters clashed with activists of the Samajwadi Party leading to street violence. Thackeray also criticised noted film actor turned politician Amitabh Bachchan, a native of Allahabad in Uttar Pradesh, for business towards Uttar Pradesh because of Amar Singh. Bachchan came into fame and fortune in Mumbai's film industry;– Bollywood.

On 8 September 2008, Infosys Technologies announced that 3,000 employee positions had been shifted from Pune due to construction delays caused earlier that year by MNS attacks on North Indian construction workers in Maharashtra.
On 15 October 2008, Thackeray threatened to shut down Jet Airways operations in Maharashtra if they did not rehire probationary employees that had been shed in a cost-cutting move forced by the economic downturn.

In October 2008, MNS activists beat up North Indian candidates appearing for the all-India Railway Recruitment Board entrance exam for the Western region in Mumbai. One Bihari died because of train accident and rioting ensued following coverage in Hindi Media with support from NCP/Congress. In retaliation for the MNS' attack on Biharis and North Indians in general, the Bharatiya Bhojpuri Sangh attacked the residence of a Marathi official of Tata Motors in Jamshedpur. Following the uproar in the Indian parliament, and calls that there was no pressure to arrest the MNS chief, Raj Thackeray was arrested in the early hours of 21 October. He was produced before a court on the day itself and would return the next day after spending the night in jail. Following the arrest, however, MNS party activists took out their anger on parts of Mumbai city and the region at large. The arrest resulted in applause, fear and calls for a ban on the MNS. The Shiv Sena, however, maintained a cool response, although senior party leader Manohar Joshi said they were close to supporting the MNS in their agitation against the non-Marathi candidates for the railway board exam.

Clash with Shiv Sena
On 10 October 2006 clashes erupted between supporters of Shiv Sena and Maharashtra Navnirman Sena headed by Raj Thackeray. It was alleged that workers of MNS had torn the posters bearing the photographs of Shiv Sena Supremo Bal Thackeray near the SIES college in Mumbai. Later as a retaliation, it was alleged that Shiv Sena workers brought down the hoardings with Raj Thackeray's photo near the Sena Bhavan at Dadar. As the news spread about the incident groups gathered near the Sena Bhavan and started pelting stones at each other. In this incident a policeman was injured and many supporters of both parties were injured. To restore order the police fired tear gas shells at the mob. Decorum was eventually restored following police action and the appearance of Uddhav Thackeray and his cousin Raj Thackeray at the venue. Uddhav appealed to Sena workers to go back home. He said:
"The police will take necessary action. This is happening because many people are joining us from MNS. The defections have started and that is why they are resorting to such actions".
The division chief of the Shiv Sena Milind Vaidya said that they had lodged a complaint with the local police against an MNS worker who was involved in the incident. MNS general secretary Pravin Darekar, however, pinned the cause down to local elections in the SIES college. He alleges that the Sena is concerned about losing their hold over the colleges and that is why they are trying to color the issue, adding that the Sena's allegations had no merit. Raj Thackeray asserts that MNS could not have vandalized the pictures, seeing as how he and his members revere Bal Thackeray.
A Parliamentary committee was set up to examine the breach of privileges notices from some MPs for remarks made by Bal Thackeray against Uttar Bharatiyas (North-Indians). Reacting to this, MNS chief Raj Thackeray had said he would not allow any politician from UP and Bihar to enter Mumbai if the parliamentary panel insisted on summoning Bal.

Bal countered this by terming his nephew Raj a backstabber and reacted to the MNS chief with a "big no thank you."

Shiv Sena (SS) and MNS workers also clashed at Anand Nagar in Oshiwara over the issuance of Navratri posters during the holiday season. SS corporator Rajul Patel said "The MNS activists had put up huge hoardings and were demanding money from people to remove them. People complained to us and we objected. This led to a scuffle." MNS Vibhag Pramukh (Division Leader) Manish Dhuri retorted that "the Sainiks are jealous of our popularity. On Sunday afternoon, a mob of Shiv Sainiks came to the area and started pulling down posters that were put up by us. We objected to this. Unfortunately, one MNS activist sustained severe injuries."

Denunciation of MLA Abu Azmi
On 9 November 2009 Abu Azmi of the Samajwadi Party was denounced and prevented by MLA of the MNS from taking his oath in Hindi and not in state official language Marathi. As a result of this incident, the speaker of the Maharashtra Legislative Assembly suspended the 4 MNS MLAs involved in the skirmish for a period of four years. They were also barred from entering Mumbai and Nagpur whenever the assembly met in the two cities. The MLAs suspended were Ram Kadam, Ramesh Wanjale, Shishir Shinde and Vasant Gite. The suspension was later revoked in July 2010.

Growth in potency

In October 2008, Jet Airways laid off almost 1,000 employees. In the frenzy for reinstatement that followed numerous political parties took the stand for the probationers’ cause. First the MNS and the SS came in, then the established national parties, the Congress and the BJP. Even the CPI M, rallied in support of the laid off Kolkata employees.

One day after the lay off, the retrenched former staff flocked to the MNS office, even though the SS labour arm, the Bharatiya Kamgar Sena generally rules the aviation unions.  The MNS then led more than 300 former employees to Jet's office in Marol. MNS general secretary Nitin Sardesai said, "We met Jet officials today while a lot of (cabin) crew and MNS workers were protesting outside. While we were talking, Jet chairman Naresh Goyal telephoned Raj Thackeray... He requested us to end the protest and offered to meet Raj in a couple of days. We had a one-point agenda that those laid off should be taken back."

In two days the MNS march and support got the staff re-hired. The media widely appeared to pronounce Raj as having won the game of one upmanship with the SS, whose mantle of aggressive street politics was seen as having been usurped. This was a big boost for the MNS' newly formed trade union, the Maharashtra Navnirman Kamgar Sena, which has been trying to cut into the SS' influence in the aviation, hotel and entertainment sectors.

Elected representatives
Performance in the 2012 Maharashtra municipal elections.

MNS won 13 assembly seats (out of 288) in the 2009 assembly elections Maharashtra. These include 6 in Mumbai, 2 in Thane, 3 in Nashik,1 in Pune and 1 in Kannad (Aurangabad) and remain at 2nd spot at more than 24 places. This result (4.5% seats) makes MNS, fourth in largest party in Maharashtra assembly after Congress-NCP (144 seats), BJP-Shiv-Sena (90 seats), Third Front (14 seats).

In the 2014 Assembly elections, the MNS was trounced. It was only able to win 1 seat across the state. It lost all 10 seats held by it. It also lost on all 6 seats held by it in Mumbai, including Mahim, a Shiv Sena stronghold, which it had previously won from the Sena. Its candidates forfeited their deposits on a record 203 seats out of the 288 seats in the state, and the 218 seats on which it fielded candidates.

In the Bruhanmumbai Municipal Corporation (BMC) elections held in 2017, the tally of MNS was reduced to 7 seats. In Oct 2017, 6 councillors defected to Shiv Sena, thus taking its representation down to 1 seat.

Political criticism
Following an attack on North Indians who had turned up to the RRB (Railway Recruitment Board) railway exam in Mumbai, numerous politicians, mainly from the then ruling UPA central government, harshly criticised Raj Thackeray and the MNS.

Three UPA ministers demanded tough action, including a call for a ban against the party. Railway Minister Lalu Prasad Yadav demanded a ban on the MNS and saying its chief was a "mental case," Steel Minister Ram Vilas Paswan added that he would raise the issue in the next cabinet meeting and wondered why no action was being, or had been, taken against the MNS despite a repetition of such violent incidents. He said: "I strongly condemn the incident. There should be strong action against that party... MNS should be banned. [The] Thackeray family has become a chronic problem for Maharashtra and Raj Thackeray, in particular, has become a mental case." The Minister for Food Processing Industries, as well as a Congress leader, Subodh Kant Sahay demanded the Congress-NCP coalition government in Maharashtra treat those responsible for the attacks as criminals. He said, "I have spoken to Maharashtra Chief Minister Vilasrao Deshmukh and asked him on the goondaism that is going on in the state." As far the government's action till date is concerned, it has been soft on them. It should take action as too much has already happened there." They are not workers. They are looters. Organisations like MNS, Bajrang Dal, VHP and RSS should be banned."

On the first working day following the incident, uproarious scenes were seen in the national parliament. Numerous members of Parliament condemned the attacks. They also indirectly criticised railway minister Lalu Prasad Yadav while noting that even in their regions, the maximum recruitments being made were those of people from Bihar and not from the state where the recruitment drives were held, adding some credence to the MNS' drive. Speaking first on the issue, RJD leader Devendra Prasad Yadav demanded that the Centre take action in the state under Article 355. He noted that despite the attacks, the Maharashtra chief minister has maintained a silence on the issue, adding that such actions threaten the unity and integrity of the country. Other MP's also demanded the invocation of Article 355 in the light of the attacks. Shahnawaz Hussain of the BJP made such demands in asking if people from Bihar and Uttar Pradesh needed a permit to travel to other parts of the country. The CPI M's Mohammed Salim said that such incidents threaten the country's integrity and send a wrong signal to the rest of the country. Anant Geete of the Shiv Sena, however, tried to give the other side of the story by noting the 4.2 million educated and unemployed youth in Maharashtra. The CPI (M) strongly condemned the attack, terming them a "blatant" assault on the Constitution and demanded the immediate arrest of party chief Raj Thackeray, adding that any leniency shown to "divisive forces" will have far-reaching consequences. The CPI(M) Politburo said the attack on the Constitution was a poor showing on the Maharashtra government which is duty bound to protect and take stringent action against the perpetrators of such crimes. "That it has failed to do so and in fact showing leniency to the leader of the outfit shows the utter bankruptcy of the politics of Congress and its coalition partner." The CPI also said such attacks should not be tolerated and Thackeray and his supporters must be "immediately arrested and prosecuted". Maharashtra Chief Minister Vilasrao Deshmukh said his government is responsible for failure in preventing attacks and ordered a probe into the incident, which will also inquire into why the job advertisements where not given in Marathi newspapers. He said: "What has happened is not good. Such incidents take place because of loopholes in the law. One can't hold only the Home Ministry responsible for it, it is (entire) Government's responsibility. Such incidents are affecting the image of the state and I have instructed the DGP to take stern action." On Raj Thackeray's accusation that job advertisements were not published in local newspapers to keep out Maharashtrian candidates, he said, "An inquiry would also be conducted about why advertisements about the examination were not given in Marathi newspapers and the number of Marathi candidates invited for the exam." He also assured that such incidents of vandalism would not take place in future.

During the 2008 Mumbai Terror Attacks, NSG commandos bravely defended the city. They were several commandos from North India whereas the MNS was not seen helping. This led to a great deal of criticism for the MNS since they had vehemently opposed North Indians earlier. In January 2009, artist Pranava Prakash exhibited his painting series "Chal Hat Be Bihari" in Delhi. It showed in pop style the 2008 attacks on North Indians in Maharashtra in the context of xenophobia.

Violence and controversies 

In 2008, MNS created panic among several shop owners through diktat on Marathi signboards.

In December 2012, MNS corporator Nitin Nikam repeatedly slapped a 65-year-old contractor over alleged delay in repairing pipeline causing water shortage.

In March 2013, 5 MNS and Shiv Sena MLAs assaulted Assistant Police Inspector Sachin Suryavanshi in the state assembly.

In January 2014, a mob constituting MNS workers attacked toll booths in eight cities across Maharashtra, and demanding closing of toll booths where the construction cost is below 2 crores.

In 2017,  MNS workers forcibly removed the signboards of several Gujarati shops claiming they were Belittling Marathi Language.

In May 2018, three trans-women were attacked brutally by more than 20 MNS workers. The trans-women sustained severe injuries.

In June 2018, Kishor Shinde, a former corporator, slapped a multiplex manager repeatedly over high food prices and ban of food items in multiplex theaters .

In September 2018, a mob of MNS workers assaulted a man because of his Facebook post criticising a cartoon drawn by Raj Thackeray. The workers made the man delete his comments, and forced him to apologize. MNS leader Avinash Jadhav threatened the public with similar consequences, "if such things happened again."

In January 2020 on the birth anniversary of Bal Thackeray, his nephew Raj Thackeray changed his party flag colour to Bhagwa (Bhagwa Dhwaj) and agenda from Marathi interest to Hindutva or Hindu nationalism giving a speech against Indian Muslims about disturbances caused by their prayers. He supported National Register of Citizens by saying that "only Indians can live in my country and other countries people can't live in India without passport and VISA so what's wrong in this act?". He also stated that Bangladeshis and Pakistanis should go back to their respective countries or they'll be thrown back forcefully.

See also
 2008 All-India Railway Recruitment Board examination attack

References

External links
 Official Maharashtra Navnirman Sena Website
 Official Maharashtra Navnirman Sena student wing Website
 Election Television Commercials Of Maharashtra Navnirman Sena

 
Political parties in Maharashtra
Far-right politics in India
Political parties established in 2006
2006 establishments in Maharashtra
Conservative parties in India
Right-wing populism in India
Anti-Bihari sentiment
Right-wing populist parties
Hindutva
Regionalist parties in India